Zinc finger protein 239 is a protein that in humans is encoded by the ZNF239 gene.

Function 

MOK2 proteins are DNA- and RNA-binding proteins that are mainly associated with nuclear RNP components, including the nucleoli and extranucleolar structures.

Interactions 

ZNF239 has been shown to interact with LMNA.

References

Further reading 

 
\*

External links 
 

Transcription factors